The 2002 Volta a la Comunitat Valenciana was the 60th edition of the Volta a la Comunitat Valenciana road cycling stage race, which was held from 26 February to 2 March 2002. The race started in Calpe and finished in Valencia.

General classification

References

Volta a la Comunitat Valenciana
2002 in Spanish road cycling